Mark Salmon (born 23 February 1963 in Pontypridd) is a former Welsh professional darts player who competed in both the British Darts Organisation and Professional Darts Corporation circuits. Salmon was inspired to play darts by Leighton Rees, the first World Champion and played with flights bearing Leighton's face in his honour.

Career

Salmon played in the 1996 BDO World Darts Championship, losing in the first round 3–0 to Roland Scholten. A month later, Salmon won the Scottish Open, beating fellow Welshman Sean Palfrey in the final. Salmon never progressed further in the BDO and in 2005 he began playing in PDC where he qualified for the 2006 PDC World Darts Championship, beating Rod Harrington and Owen Caffrey to qualify. He was beaten in the first round 3–2 by Dennis Smith. Salmon struggled on the PDC circuit, failing to qualify for the UK Open and the World Matchplay.  

After failing to qualify for the 2007 World Championship, Salmon moved back to the BDO and qualified for the 2009 BDO World Darts Championship, taking one of the non-seeded places. He was drawn against Darryl Fitton in the first round and lost all nine legs in a 3–0 defeat.

World Championship Results

BDO

 1996: 1st Round (lost to Roland Scholten 0–3)
 2009: 1st Round (lost to Darryl Fitton 0–3)

PDC

 2006: 1st Round (lost to Dennis Smith 2–3)

External links
Profile and stats on Darts Database

1963 births
Living people
Welsh darts players
Professional Darts Corporation associate players
British Darts Organisation players